Michael Price (born October 22, 1958) is an American writer and producer, best known for his Emmy and Writers Guild award-winning work on The Simpsons.  Price is a writer and co-executive producer of the ABC series Teacher's Pet. He served as a script consultant on The Simpsons Movie and wrote the Lego Star Wars special, Lego Star Wars: The Padawan Menace. He works at Lucasfilm writing and producing Lego Star Wars Franchise.

Other television shows he has written for include What About Joan?, The PJs, Teen Angel, Homeboys in Outer Space, The Newz and One Minute to Air.

Price co-wrote and co-produced the Bill Burr series F Is for Family in 2015 on Netflix. The show is an animated sitcom, and draws from Burr's standup.

He grew up in South Plainfield, New Jersey, and attended Montclair State University, where he earned a B.A. degree in Theatre Arts, and Tulane University, where he earned a Master of Fine Arts degree in directing for the theatre.

Filmography

The Simpsons episodes

References

External links
 

American television writers
American male television writers
Living people
Montclair State University alumni
People from South Plainfield, New Jersey
Tulane University alumni
Place of birth missing (living people)
Writers Guild of America Award winners
Annie Award winners
1958 births
Television producers from New Jersey